Debbie Graham and Brenda Schultz-McCarthy were the defending champions, but decided not to compete together. Graham partnered with Mariaan de Swardt, but lost in the semifinals to Alexandra Fusai and Nathalie Tauziat. Schultz-McCarthy partnered with Rebecca Jensen, but lost in the first round to Patricia Hy-Boulais and Chanda Rubin.

Lisa Raymond and Rennae Stubbs won the title, defeating Fusai and Tauziat 6–4, 5–7, 7–5 in the final.

Seeds

Draw

References
Main Draw

Challenge Bell
Tournoi de Québec
Can